Keyodhoo as a place name may refer to:
 Keyodhoo (Baa Atoll) (Republic of Maldives)
 Keyodhoo (Vaavu Atoll) (Republic of Maldives)